Tenzing Rigdol (born 16 January 1982 in Kathmandu, Nepal) is a contemporary Tibetan artist and activist.

Biography 
Tenzing Rigdol was born 16 January 1982 in Kathmandu, Nepal. He is chiefly known for his contemporary pieces although he is also trained in the ancient art of thangka. Rigdol is a graduate of the University of Colorado Denver College of Arts & Media. He holds a master's degree in philosophy, BA-BFA in art, art history and received Honorary Doctorate in 2022 from University of Colorado Board Of Regents. 

Rigdol has exhibited widely internationally, and his artworks are included in public and private collections around the world. In 2011, his site-specific installation Our Land, Our People, which received global media coverage, involved the covert transportation of twenty tonnes of soil out of Tibet, through Nepal, to Dharamsala, India. There, displaced Tibetans were given the opportunity to walk on their native soil once again. The soil’s journey was later chronicled in a full-length feature documentary, Bringing Tibet Home (2013). The film was awarded the Young European Jury Award (Prix du Jury de Jeunes Européens) at the 27th edition of FIPA (International Festival of Audiovisual Programmes).

In 2014, Rigdol became one of only two contemporary Tibetan artists to be included in the exhibition Tibet and India: Buddhist Traditions and Transformations at the Metropolitan Museum of Art in New York. His work Pin drop silence: Eleven-headed Avalokiteshvara (2013) was also the first work by a contemporary Tibetan artist to be acquired by the Met.

Rigdol is a founder of  the Dialogue Artist Residency (DAR), the first Tibetan artist residency programme focussing primarily on fostering contemporary Tibetan artists (writers, musicians, filmmakers, painters, sculptors) by grouping them withother international artists. He has also collaborated with contemporary Tibetan filmmakers, mostly assuming the role of producer or co-producer , including the well-received documentary, Bringing Tibet Home(2013), which is notably the first full-length feature documentary on a contemporary Tibetan artist or art.

Rigdol lives and works between India, Nepal, Prague and the United States.

Rigdol is also the author of collections of poems.

Exhibitions 
Work of Rigdol is exhibited worldwide, An (incomplete) list of other exhibitions is as follows:

In May 2006, he participated in the exhibition The Missing Peace at Fowler Museum at UCLA Los Angeles and in September the same year in the exhibition Waves on the Turquoise Lake: Contemporary Expressions of Tibetan Art at CU Art Museum, University of Colorado at Boulder in the United States.

In 2007 he exhibited at the Rubin Museum of Art in New York.

From 11 February to 27 March 2009, his work was exhibited by Rossi & Rossi gallery in London and in 2010 in Hong Kong.

In 2010, he participated in the exhibition "The Scorching Sun of Tibet" in Songzhuang art colony in Beijing, China.

From June to October 2010, he participated in the exhibition "Tradition transformed", the first contemporary art exhibition at the Rubin Museum of Art in New York.

In 2012, he participated in the exhibition Face to Face at the Tel Aviv Museum of Art in Israel.

In January and February 2014, his work was exhibited at the Robert Hull Fleming Museum located in the University of Vermont in the United States.

In February–June 2014, he was one of two contemporary artists from Tibet and India in the New Beginnings exhibit at the Metropolitan Museum of Art in New York.

2015

Change Is the Eternal Law, Rossi & Rossi Hong Kong

2019

Dialogue, Rossi & Rossi Hong Kong

My World Is in Your Blind-Spot, Tibet House Gallery, Tibet House US, New York, USA

My World Is in Your Blind-Spot, Emmanuel Art Gallery, Denver, CO, USA

Perilous Bodies, Ford Foundation, New York

Books
 2009 : Tenzing Rigdol: Experiment with Forms, Rossi & Rossi, 
 2020 : Dialogue

Collections of poems 
 2008 : R–The Frozen Ink, Paljor Publications,  
 2011 : Anatomy of Nights, Tibet Writes
 2011 : Butterfly’s Wings, Tibet Writes

References

External links 

 Our Land, Our People, Video : conversation of Sharon Hom (HRIC) with Tenzing Rigdol, June 2011
 Children on Soil, Art works of Tenzing Rigdol on Rossi & Rossi website

Tibetan artists
Tibetan male actors
1982 births
Living people
American people of Tibetan descent
Tibetan activists
Tibetan poets
University of Colorado Denver alumni
People from Queens, New York
International Writing Program alumni